Robert Vela High School (RVHS) is a public high school in the district of Edinburg, Texas (United States). It is named after a former coach from Edinburg High, the late Roberto Vela. The school was established in 2012 and is located on Canton Road in Edinburg. Their mascot is the Mighty SaberCat with the colors of blue, black, and silver. It was formerly Edinburg High School, home to The Bobcats before it changed and became Robert Vela High School.

Students enrolled in Robert Vela High School have made numerous accounts on Instagram, one of the most popular being The rvhs.sleeping.page, as part of a trend from TikTok. Such accounts vary though many have been hacked from spam accounts promoting Bitcoin.

In addition to sections of Edinburg, a small portion of Lopezville is zoned to RVHS.

References

External links
 Official Website

Buildings and structures in Edinburg, Texas
Edinburg Consolidated Independent School District high schools
Education in Edinburg, Texas